Flatfork is an unincorporated community in Roane County, in the U.S. state of West Virginia.

History
A post office called Flat Fork was established in 1857, the name was changed to Flatfork in 1895, and the post office closed in 1935. The community takes its name from nearby Flat Fork creek.

References

Unincorporated communities in Roane County, West Virginia
1857 establishments in Virginia
Unincorporated communities in West Virginia